The 459th Airlift Squadron is part of the 374th Airlift Wing at Yokota Air Base, Japan.  It operates the UH-1N Iroquois and the C-12J Huron aircraft, performing passenger transport (including VIPs), aeromedical evacuation and search and rescue missions.

History
The 459th was originally established in mid-1942 as the 459th Bombardment Squadron under II Bomber Command as a B-17 Flying Fortress Replacement Training Unit (RTU). They operated until March 1944 with the end of Heavy Bomber training.

B-29 Superfortress operations against Japan
The 459th Bombardment Squadron was reorganized as a Boeing B-29 Superfortress Very Heavy bombardment squadron on 1 April 1944. After completion of training in January 1945, they moved to North Field, Guam, in the Mariana Islands of the Central Pacific Area, and were assigned to XXI Bomber Command, Twentieth Air Force. The squadron's mission was the strategic bombardment of the Japanese home islands and the destruction of its war-making capability.

The Squadron Flew "shakedown" missions against Japanese targets on Moen Island, Truk, and other points in the Carolines and Marianas. The squadron began missions over Japan on 25 February 1945 with a firebombing mission over northeast Tokyo. The squadron continued to participate in wide-area firebombing attacks, but when the Army Air Forces ran out of incendiary bombs after ten days, the squadron flew conventional strategic bombing missions using high explosive bombs.

The squadron continued attacking urban areas with incendiary raids until the end of the war in August 1945, attacking major Japanese cities and causing massive destruction of urbanized areas. They also conducted raids against strategic objectives such as aircraft factories, chemical plants, oil refineries, and other targets in Japan. The squadron flew its last combat missions on 14 August when hostilities ended.  Afterwards, the squadron's B 29s carried relief supplies to Allied prisoner of war camps in Japan and Manchuria.

The squadron remained in the western Pacific, although largely demobilized in the fall of 1945. Some of the squadron's aircraft were scrapped on Tinian; others were flown to storage depots in the United States.  The squadron was inactive from the end of 1945 until 1949.

United States Air Force
During the Vietnam War the squadron was reactivated at Cam Ranh Air Base, South Vietnam, in 1966. It provided intra-theatre airlift services in Vietnam, including air-land and airdrop assault missions from 1966 to 1970. The unit was inactivated as part of the drawdown of United States forces.

The squadron conducted airlifts of key Department of Defense personnel from April 1975 to March 1978, aeromedical airlifts from March 1978 to November 1991, and operational support airlifts since December 1991.

Operations and decorations
 Combat Operations: Combat in Western Pacific, c. 12 April – 14 August 1945. Intra-theatre airlift in Southeast Asia, January 1967 – May 1970
 Campaigns: World War II: Air Offensive, Japan; Western Pacific. Vietnam: Vietnam Air Offensive; Vietnam Air Offensive, Phase II; Vietnam Air Offensive, Phase III; Vietnam Air/Ground; Vietnam Air Offensive, Phase IV; TET 69/Counteroffensive; Vietnam Summer-Fall, 1969; Vietnam Winter-Spring, 1970; Sanctuary Counteroffensive
 Decorations: Distinguished Unit Citations: Japan, 10 May 1945; Tokyo and Yokohama, Japan, 23–29 May 1945.  Presidential Unit Citations (Southeast Asia) 21 January – 12 May 1968; 1 April – 30 June 1970; Navy Presidential Unit Citation: Vietnam, 20 January – 1 April 1968; Air Force Outstanding Unit Award with Combat "V" Device 1 January – 30 April 1967; 1 May 1967 – 30 April 1968; 1 July 1970 – 31 December 1971. Republic of Vietnam Gallantry Cross with Palm: 1 January 1967 – 30 April 1972

Lineage
459th Airlift Squadron
 Constituted as the 459th Bombardment Squadron (Heavy) on 1 July 1942
 Activated on 6 July 1942
 Inactivated on 1 April 1944
 Redesignated 459th Bombardment Squadron, Very Heavy and activated on 1 April 1944
 Inactivated on 21 December 1945
 Redesignated 459th Troop Carrier Squadron, Medium on 26 May 1952
 Activated in the reserve on 14 June 1952
 Inactivated on 14 July 1952
 Redesignated 459th Troop Carrier Squadron and activated, on 12 October 1966 (not organized)
 Organized on 1 January 1967
 Redesignated 459th Tactical Airlift Squadron on 1 August 1967
 Inactivated on 1 June 1970
 Consolidated with the 1400th Military Airlift Squadron on 1 December 1991 as the 459th Airlift Squadron
 Inactivated on 1 October 1993
 Activated on 1 October 1993

1400th Military Airlift Squadron
 Designated as the 1400th Military Airlift Squadron and activated on 1 April 1975
 Consolidated with the 459th Tactical Airlift Squadron on 1 December 1991 as the 459th Airlift Squadron

Assignments
 330th Bombardment Group, 6 July 1952 – 1 April 1944
 330th Bombardment Group, 1 April 1944 – 27 December 1945
 330th Troop Carrier Group, 14 June 1952 – 14 July 1952
 Pacific Air Forces, 12 October 1966 (not organized)
 483d Troop Carrier Wing (later 483d Tactical Airlift Wing), 1 January 1967 – 1 March 1972
 89th Military Airlift Wing, 1 April 1975
 375th Aeromedical Airlift Wing (later 375th Military Airlift Wing), 15 March 1978
 375th Operations Group, 1 December 1991
 22d Operations Group, 1 April 1993 – 1 October 1993
 374th Operations Group, 1 October 1993 – present

Stations

 Salt Lake City Army Air Base, Utah, 6 July 1942
 Alamogordo Army Air Field, New Mexico, 1 August 1942
 Biggs Field, Texas, 2 September 1942
 Alamogordo Army Air Field, New Mexico, 29 November 1942
 Biggs Field, Texas, 5 April 1943 – 1 April 1944
 Walker Army Air Field, Kansas, 1 April 1944
 Dalhart Army Air Field, Texas, 25 May 1944
 Walker Army Air Field, Kansas, 1 August 1944 – 7 January 1945

 North Field, Guam, Northern Mariana Islands, 18 February – 19 November 1945
 Camp Anza, California, c. 18–27 December 1945
 Greater Pittsburgh Airport, Pennsylvania, 14 June 1952 − 14 July 1952
 Cam Ranh Air Base, South Vietnam, 1 January 1966 – 30 April 1972
 Detachment at Don Muang Airport, Thailand
 Andrews Air Force Base, Maryland, 1 April 1975
 Scott Air Force Base, Illinois. 15 March 1978 – 1 October 1993
 Yokota Air Base, Japan, 1 October 1993 – present

Aircraft

Boeing B-17 Flying Fortress (1942, 1944)
Consolidated B-24 Liberator (1942–1944)
Boeing B-29 Superfortress (1944–1945)
de Havilland Canada C-7 Caribou (1967–1970)
North American T-39 Sabreliner (1975–1984)

Learjet C-21 (1993–2007)
3 Beechcraft C-12 Huron (2007–present)
4 Bell UH-1N Twin Huey (1993–present)

See also

References
 Notes

Bibliography

External links
374th Airlift Wing

459